Geoffrey Nels Fieger (born December 23, 1950) is an American attorney based in Southfield, Michigan. Fieger is the senior partner at the law firm of  Fieger, Fieger, Kenney & Harrington P.C., and is an occasional legal commentator for NBC and MSNBC. His practice focuses on personal injury, civil rights litigation and medical malpractice cases.

Fieger served as the defense attorney for Jack Kevorkian and was an unsuccessful Democratic nominee for governor of Michigan in 1998.

Early life and family
Fieger grew up in Oak Park, Michigan, a northern suburb of Detroit, Michigan, the son of June Beth (née Oberer) and Bernard Julian Fieger. Fieger's father was Jewish, and his mother was of Norwegian descent. He earned B.A. (Theater, 1974) and M.A. (Speech) degrees from the University of Michigan, Ann Arbor in 1976 and his J.D. from the Detroit College of Law (now the Michigan State University College of Law) in 1979.

Fieger and his wife Kathleen have three children and live in Bloomfield Hills, Michigan. Fieger is the older brother of the late Doug Fieger, lead vocalist of the late-'70s/early-'80s rock group The Knack, best known for their hit song "My Sharona" in 1979.

Legal career
Fieger has been involved with a variety of high-profile or controversial cases. In 1994, he represented Jack Kevorkian in the first of several doctor-assisted suicide trials. Kevorkian was acquitted in that trial and all subsequent trials where Fieger represented him. (Kevorkian was convicted when he represented himself in his last assisted suicide trial in 1999.)  These events were made into a movie, You Don't Know Jack, aired on HBO, in which Fieger was portrayed by actor  Danny Huston.

Other notable clients and cases include:
 The family of Scott Amedure in a 1999 wrongful death and negligence suit against The Jenny Jones Show.
 The family of Isaiah Shoels, who was killed in the Columbine High School massacre.
 Ralf Panitz, accused of killing his ex-wife Nancy Campbell-Panitz in July 2000, following their appearance along with Panitz's new wife, on a segment of The Jerry Springer Show.  Panitz was convicted in 2002.
 The family of Aiyana Jones, a seven-year-old girl who was shot during a police raid in 2010, conducted while a crew was doing a taping of the A&E reality show The First 48. 
 A lawsuit against the Michigan State Police on behalf of the family of 64-year-old Jacqueline Nichols, a pedestrian who was killed when a cruiser crashed into her during a police chase in Flint on July 3, 2014. The state agreed to settle the suit for $7.7 million.
 A $100 million class action lawsuit in regards to the 2014-2015 Legionnaires' disease outbreak in the Flint, Michigan area, on behalf of four Genesee County residents who contracted the water borne illness during the Flint water crisis, including one woman who died seven days after entering the emergency room with a headache. The suit names McLaren Regional Medical Center in Flint and several Michigan Department of Environmental Quality officials as defendants.
 The family of Kenneka Jenkins, a 19-year-old girl who was found dead in a Rosemont, Illinois hotel freezer in 2017 after a night of partying.
 A $100 million lawsuit in regards to the 2021 Oxford High School shooting was filed by Fieger against Oxford Community Schools on behalf of a 17-year-old student who was shot in the neck and her sister who was walking next to her as she was shot. The suit claims that the girls are experiencing PTSD and that the school failed to protect the students by allowing the shooter to return to class after they had direct information that he was exhibiting homicidal ideation.

Political career

1998 gubernatorial campaign

In 1998, Fieger ran unsuccessfully as the Democratic nominee for Governor of Michigan. During the campaign Fieger made several inflammatory and controversial comments and statements, including
 an assertion that his opponent John Engler was the product of miscegenation between humans and barnyard animals;
 a claim that "rabbis are closer to Nazis than they think."
 the observation that, "in 2,000 years we've probably made somebody who is the equivalent of Elvis into God, so I see no reason why not to believe that in 2,000 years Elvis will be God.  Probably if we went back 2,000 years, and they said, you know, we think Jesus is God, and Jesus is just some goofball that got nailed to the cross."
 a radio appearance characterizing Michigan appellate judges as "jackasses" for overturning a 15 million dollar medical malpractice judgment he had won. (A lower court reprimand based on these comments was eventually upheld by the Michigan Supreme Court.)

Other activities
In 1997, Fieger donated four million dollars to the Detroit College of Law, now the Michigan State University College of Law, to start the nation's first trial practice institute for law students, which was named the Geoffrey Fieger Trial Practice Institute.

Fieger appeared as one of the attorneys on the reality TV series Power of Attorney, and was opposing counsel in an episode of NBC's The Law Firm.

Trial and acquittal
In August 2007, Fieger was indicted on federal campaign finance charges; the U.S. government alleged that Fieger had illegally funneled $127,000 to John Edwards' 2004 presidential campaign. Fieger was defended by famed defense attorney Gerry Spence, who announced this would be his last case. A jury acquitted Fieger of all 10 charges, and Fieger's co-defendant and law partner Ven Johnson on five charges, on June 2, 2008. Johnson stated that the charges were politically motivated.

References

External links
 Geoffrey Fieger Trial Practice Institute
 Six-part special in the Detroit Free Press on Fieger (articles archived by the Internet Archive):
 Part 1, 
 Part 2, 
 Part 3, 
 Part 4, 
 Part 5, 
 Part 6, 
 You Don't Know Jack – IMDB
 

1950 births
American activists
American male writers
American people of Jewish descent
American people of Norwegian descent
American television personalities
Male television personalities
Criminal defense lawyers
Detroit College of Law alumni
Living people
Michigan Democrats
Michigan lawyers
People from Southfield, Michigan
Trial lawyers
University of Michigan School of Music, Theatre & Dance alumni
People from Bloomfield Hills, Michigan